Nisar Wahdat (born 22 June 1999) is an Afghan cricketer. He made his first-class debut for Amo Region in the 2018 Ahmad Shah Abdali 4-day Tournament on 1 March 2018. Prior to his first-class debut, he was part of Afghanistan's squad for the 2018 Under-19 Cricket World Cup.

He made his List A debut for Amo Region in the 2018 Ghazi Amanullah Khan Regional One Day Tournament on 10 July 2018. He was the leading run-scorer in the 2018–19 Mirwais Nika Provincial 3-Day tournament, with 653 runs in five matches. He made his Twenty20 debut for Boost Defenders in the 2019 Shpageeza Cricket League on 11 October 2019.

References

External links
 

1999 births
Living people
Afghan cricketers
Amo Sharks cricketers
Place of birth missing (living people)